Caerwedros is a small village in western Ceredigion, Wales, in the community of Llandysiliogogo.

Caerwedros village has a Memorial Hall – Neuadd Goffa Caerwedros for community use, including the annual Caerwedros Produce Show held in August each year.

New Quay & District Country Market have a market in this hall every week

Location 

Caerwedros is located three miles from New Quay and Cwmtydu beach.

History and amenities 

The site of Caerwedros Castle, is today a mound of earth on the west side of the village. Caerwedros has seen expansion in the last few years by the development of a small number of new houses and bungalows.

External links
www.geograph.co.uk : photos of Caerwedros and surrounding area

Villages in Ceredigion